The Family and Consumer Sciences Research Journal is a quarterly peer-reviewed academic journal published by Wiley-Blackwell on behalf of the American Association of Family & Consumer Sciences. The journal was established in 1972 and published by SAGE Publications until 2010. The current editor-in-chief is Sharon A. DeVaney (Purdue University). The journal covers consumerism, human development and family studies.

References

External links 
 

Wiley-Blackwell academic journals
English-language journals
Publications established in 1972
Sociology journals
Quarterly journals